Nueve de Julio Airport  is a public use airport serving Nueve de Julio, a town in the Buenos Aires Province of Argentina.

See also

Transport in Argentina
List of airports in Argentina

References

External links 
OpenStreetMap - Nueve de Julio Airport
FallingRain - Nueve De Julio Airport

Airports in Argentina
Buenos Aires Province